The women's tournament of water polo at the 2009 Summer Universiade at Belgrade, Serbia began on July 1 and ended on July 11.

Teams

Preliminary round

Group A

Group B

Quarterfinals

Semifinals

Finals

Final 7-8 places

Final 5-6 places

Bronze medal match

Final

Final standings

External links
Reports

Water polo at the 2009 Summer Universiade